Thomas Cookes is the name of:

 Sir Thomas Cookes, 2nd Baronet (1648–1701), English philanthropist
 Thomas Cookes (MP) (1804–1900), English politician